Heartless is an American 1997 television film directed by Judith Vogelsang and starring Madchen Amick, David Packer, Tom Schanley, and Louise Fletcher.

Plot
A heart transplant recipient adopts the personality of her donor.

Cast
Madchen Amick as Annie O'Keefe
David Packer as Dep. Johnny Drummond
Tom Schanley as Alexander Hawks
Louise Fletcher as Lydia McGuffy 
Pamela Bellwood as Jennifer Chadway
Monique Parent as Suzanne Chadway Hawks
Rusty Schwimmer as Connie
Emily Kuroda as Dr. Alice Morisaki
Bo Svenson as Sam

References

1997 television films
1997 films
USA Network original films